was a town in Kinosaki District, Hyōgo Prefecture, Japan.

On April 1, 2005, Takeno, along with the towns of Kinosaki and Hidaka (all from Kinosaki District), and the towns of Izushi and Tantō (both from Izushi District), was merged into the expanded city of Toyooka, and no longer exists as an independent municipality.

, the district of Takeno had an estimated population of 4,973.

Tourism
Takeno beach is a tourist destination during the summer months.

References

External links

 Official website of Toyooka 

Dissolved municipalities of Hyōgo Prefecture
Toyooka, Hyōgo